The Perth Convention and Exhibition Centre is a privately owned convention centre located in Perth, Western Australia.

Description

It contains state-of-the-art technical facilities, six exhibition pavilions, a 2,500 seat tiered theatre, banquet/ballrooms and 23 meeting rooms.

History

Premier Richard Court, announced in November 2000 that a contract had been signed with Multiplex after five months of negotiations. Construction was to commence in June 2001 with a late 2003 completion date.

Built by Multiplex at a cost of A$225 million it was officially opened in August 2004 by Premier Geoff Gallop. Its construction was extremely controversial, owing to an overblown budget and an unprepossessing external appearance. It has been described as a "Soviet-era mausoleum" and a "giant grey cockroach", as well as a white elephant whose financial viability has been questionable. However, it made it possible for Perth to host the 2011 Commonwealth Heads of Government Meeting (CHOGM), with heads of state and official delegates of more than 50 member countries.

The Wyllie Group have a 35-year lease on the centre until 2039. It is managed by the Spotless Group, who will be spending $50 million over the 22 years, ensuring Perth Convention and Exhibition Centre remains a major destination for national and international events and provides economic value for Perth and Western Australia.

In 2016 the Perth Convention and Exhibition Centre attracted more than 900,000 visitors, including 98,000 national and international delegates.

Location
The centre is between Mounts Bay Road and the Mitchell Freeway off-ramp, with the Elizabeth Quay development adjacent to the east of the complex.

Operations
It is the only purpose-built convention centre in Western Australia and can cater for functions of up to 5,000 delegates. The project was aimed at attracting major conventions to Perth, with the state's tourism and hospitality industries in mind.

The centre has two public lifts, one travelling from the underground car park, through level one, concluding at level two; the other from level two to level three.

Events
Sexpo
Kingdomcity
Channel Seven Perth Telethon (2005 to 2019)
Madman Anime Festival
Oz Comic Con
Perth Home Show
Perth Motor Show
Skills West Expo
Supanova Pop Culture Expo (since 2014)
Wai-Con
Commonwealth Heads of Government Meeting 2011

References

External links

 

Buildings and structures in Perth, Western Australia
Landmarks in Perth, Western Australia
Convention centres in Australia
Buildings and structures completed in 2004
2004 establishments in Australia
Event venues established in 2004
Music venues in Perth, Western Australia
Economy of Perth, Western Australia